Woollum may refer to:

Woollum, Kentucky, a community in Knox County
Charlie Woollum, the former head coach of the Bucknell Bison men's basketball team